This is the discography of British beat group The Fortunes.

Albums

Studio albums

Live albums

Compilation albums

Singles

Notes

References

Discographies of British artists
Pop music group discographies
Rock music group discographies